James F. Rogers (April 9, 1872 – January 21, 1900) was an American Major League Baseball player and manager born in Hartford, Connecticut. He was an infielder for two different Major League Baseball teams, the  Washington Senators and the 1896 –  Louisville Colonels.

Career
Jim began his major league career with the 1896 Washington Senators of the National League, and split time between second base and third, hitting .279, driving in 30 runs, in 38 games played. On July 3 of that year, the Senators traded him, along with Jack Crooks and $1000 to the Louisville Colonels, also of the National League, for John O'Brien.

He hit .259 for Louisville that season, splitting his playing time at first base and second base. The following season, his last in the Majors, he began the season as player-manager, but was released on June 16, after 44 games and a 17–24 record. He signed the following day with the Pittsburgh Pirates, but did not play.

Post-career
Rogers died at the age of 27 in Bridgeport, Connecticut, and is interred at St. Michael's Cemetery in nearby Stratford. The cause of death was never released to the public. It was reported in the Jan 6, 1900, issue of The Sporting Life that Rogers death was caused by a brain injury sustained from being hit by a pitched ball earlier in his career.

See also
List of baseball players who died during their careers
List of Major League Baseball player–managers

References

External links

1872 births
1900 deaths
19th-century baseball players
Baseball players from Hartford, Connecticut
Major League Baseball infielders
Washington Senators (1891–1899) players
Louisville Colonels players
Louisville Colonels managers
Minor league baseball managers
Norwalk (minor league baseball) players
Lebanon (minor league baseball) players
Newark Little Giants players
Lynn (minor league baseball) players
Portland (minor league baseball) players
Providence Clamdiggers (baseball) players
Providence Grays (minor league) players
Springfield Ponies players
Springfield Maroons players
Lyons (minor league baseball) players
Norwich Witches players
Major League Baseball player-managers